Brünnstein is a mountain of Bavaria, Germany.

Mountains of Bavaria
One-thousanders of Germany
Mountains of the Alps